The Coast Guard House  is an historic lifesaving station at 40 Ocean Road in Narragansett, Rhode Island.

The station was built in 1888 by McKim, Mead, and White, during the heyday of Narragansett Pier as a summer resort community.  It is a roughly oblong block, semicircular at its north end, with a steep slate roof that curves with the line of the wall at the north end.  The building served as a lifesaving station from 1888 to 1946, and was converted to a restaurant in the 1960s.  This resulted in the addition of a large dining area to the south and east, and the leveling of the floor in the boat storage area.  The southern end of the second floor was damaged by fire in 1975.

The building was listed on the National Register of Historic Places in 1976.

See also
National Register of Historic Places listings in Washington County, Rhode Island

References

Government buildings completed in 1888
McKim, Mead & White buildings
Government buildings on the National Register of Historic Places in Rhode Island
Buildings and structures in Narragansett, Rhode Island
National Register of Historic Places in Washington County, Rhode Island
Historic district contributing properties in Rhode Island